Impavido (D 570) is the lead ship of the Impavido-class destroyer of the Italian Navy.

Development  
The Impavido-class were the first guided missile destroyers of the Italian Navy. The vessels were commissioned in the early 1960s and were roughly equal to the American Charles F. Adams-class destroyer. Both classes shared the Tartar missile system, with a Mk 13 launcher, and carried around 40 missiles. They had two fire control radars to guide their weaponry and all this was fitted in the aft of the ship. Both classes also had two single  guns, but the American ships had these in single mountings and in a new model, the Mk 42, one fore and the other aft, while the Impavido-class made use of an older Mk 38 dual turret.

Construction and career 
She is laid down on 10 June 1957 and launched on 25 May 1962 by Cantiere navale di Riva Trigoso. Commissioned on 16 November 1963 with the hull number D 570 and decommissioned in June 1992.

Gallery

References

External links
 Destroyer Impavido Marina Militare website

Impavido-class destroyers
1962 ships
Destroyers of the Cold War